Greenbush is a town in Sheboygan County, Wisconsin, United States. The population was 2,773 at the 2000 census. It is included in the Sheboygan, Wisconsin Metropolitan Statistical Area. The census-designated place of Greenbush is located in the town. The unincorporated community of German Corners is also located in the town.

Geography
According to the United States Census Bureau, the town has a total area of 47.4 square miles (122.8 km2), of which, 47.2 square miles (122.1 km2) of it is land and 0.3 square miles (0.7 km2) of it (0.55%) is water.

Demographics
As of the census of 2000, there were 2,773 people, 526 households, and 433 families residing in the town. The population density was 58.8 people per square mile (22.7/km2).  There were 551 housing units at an average density of 11.7 per square mile (4.5/km2). The racial makeup of the town was 74.29% White, 23.15% African American, 1.73% Native American, 0.18% Asian, 0.04% Pacific Islander, 0.29% from other races, and 0.32% from two or more races. Hispanic or Latino of any race were 3.97% of the population.

There were 526 households, out of which 40.3% had children under the age of 18 living with them, 75.9% were married couples living together, 4.2% had a female householder with no husband present, and 17.5% were non-families. 12.5% of all households were made up of individuals, and 4.9% had someone living alone who was 65 years of age or older. The average household size was 2.91 and the average family size was 3.23.

In the town, the population was spread out, with 16.1% under the age of 18, 16.5% from 18 to 24, 45.4% from 25 to 44, 17.1% from 45 to 64, and 4.9% who were 65 years of age or older. The median age was 33 years. For every 100 females, there were 273.2 males. For every 100 females age 18 and over, there were 332.3 males.

The median income for a household in the town was $54,118, and the median income for a family was $56,029. Males had a median income of $36,306 versus $26,484 for females. The per capita income for the town was $17,050. About 2.0% of families and 2.5% of the population were below the poverty line, including 2.6% of those under age 18 and 2.3% of those age 65 or over.

Historic sites
The town is home to the Wade House Historic Site.

See also
 List of towns in Wisconsin

References

External links

 
 

Towns in Sheboygan County, Wisconsin
Towns in Wisconsin

es:Greenbush (condado de Sheboygan, Wisconsin)